Donald David Newman (November 22, 1957 – September 11, 2018) was an American professional athlete in basketball and Canadian football. Following his playing career, he was the head basketball  coach at Arizona State for the 1997–98 season, and Sacramento State from 1992 to 1997. He also was an assistant coach in the NBA with the New Jersey Nets, San Antonio Spurs, and Washington Wizards.

Early life
Born and raised in New Orleans, Louisiana, Newman was a multi-sport athlete at its Brother Martin High School and graduated in 1975. In his junior year, he was a teammate of Rick Robey on the Crusaders' state championship

College career
Newman attended Louisiana State University in Baton Rouge as a freshman in the 1975–76 season and played on the LSU Tigers basketball team. After the year, he transferred to Lake City Community College and Grambling State University and then in fall 1977 to the University of Idaho in Moscow. Newman did not play at Grambling and played only one game with 

After sitting out a year due to transfer rules, Newman played for the Idaho Vandals from 1978 to 1980 under new head coach  Following five consecutive years in the Big Sky cellar, Idaho rose to second place in the conference standings in Newman's senior season and qualified for the four-team conference tournament for the first  he was a unanimous first-team all-conference  and was the player of the year. Prior to his senior year, Newman was selected in fourth round of the 1979 NBA draft by the Indiana Pacers; then was taken in the third round in 1980 by the Boston Celtics. Veteran guard Nate Archibald was a holdout during training camp, but after he agreed to terms in October, Boston head coach Bill Fitch cut Newman two days before their first regular  the Celtics went on to win the NBA title that season.

Newman also played center field for the Vandal baseball team  and was inducted into the UI athletics hall of fame

Football career

Although he had not played high school or college football, Newman tried out for the Seattle Seahawks as a cornerback  He played in the Canadian Football League with the Saskatchewan Roughriders (1981–1983), Montreal Concordes (1984), Ottawa Rough Riders (1985), and Hamilton Tiger-Cats (1986) as a wide receiver.

While playing pro football, Newman also played pro basketball for three seasons in the Continental Basketball Association (CBA) with the Montana Golden Nuggets (in Great Falls), with George Karl as head coach.

Coaching career

High school
Returning to northern Idaho in 1985, Newman was an assistant football coach at Lewiston High School for a season, then an assistant football coach and sophomore basketball coach at Moscow High School; he also worked as shoe department manager at a local store while coaching high school sports. Newman completed his bachelor's degree in physical education from the University of Idaho in 1987.

College
From 1987 to 1992, Newman was an assistant coach at neighboring Washington State in Pullman under Kelvin Sampson, and earned his master's degree in education from WSU in 1989. The Cougars made the NIT in his final year as an assistant there.

From 1992 to 1997, Newman was head coach of Sacramento State. In five seasons with a Hornets program that was transitioning from Division II to Division I, he had a  record. He then became an assistant at Arizona State in Tempe, and was appointed the head coach in September 1997 following the resignation of Bill Frieder. In his only season at ASU, Newman had an 18–14 record, concluded with a first-round loss in the NIT.

NBA
In 1999, Newman became an assistant coach for the Milwaukee Bucks under George Karl, and moved to the New Jersey Nets in 2003. In 2004, Newman joined Gregg Popovich's staff at the San Antonio Spurs. After eight seasons with the Spurs that included two NBA titles in 2005 and 2007, he joined Randy Wittman's staff at the Washington Wizards in 2012.

Death
After a long battle with brain cancer, Newman died at age 60 at his New Orleans home on September 11, 2018.

Head coaching record
Don Newman coaching record:

References

External links
Sports Reference  – Playing stats (college basketball) 
Sports Reference  – Coaching stats (college basketball)
NBA.com – Don Newman
University of Idaho Athletics Hall of Fame – Don Newman
NOLA History Guy – Don Newman
Obituary

1957 births
2018 deaths
African-American players of American football
African-American players of Canadian football
American football wide receivers
American men's basketball coaches
American men's basketball players
Arizona State Sun Devils men's basketball coaches
Basketball coaches from Louisiana
Basketball players from New Orleans
Boston Celtics draft picks
Canadian football wide receivers
College men's basketball head coaches in the United States
Florida Gateway College alumni
Guards (basketball)
Hamilton Tiger-Cats players
High school basketball coaches in Idaho
High school football coaches in Idaho
Idaho Vandals baseball players
Idaho Vandals men's basketball players
Indiana Pacers draft picks
Junior college men's basketball players in the United States
LSU Tigers baseball players
LSU Tigers basketball players
Milwaukee Bucks assistant coaches
Montana Golden Nuggets players
Montreal Alouettes players
New Jersey Nets assistant coaches
New York Jets players
Oregon Ducks men's basketball coaches
Ottawa Rough Riders players
Players of American football from New Orleans
Players of Canadian football from New Orleans
Sacramento State Hornets men's basketball coaches
San Antonio Spurs assistant coaches
Saskatchewan Roughriders players
Seattle Seahawks players
Sportspeople from New Orleans
Washington Wizards assistant coaches
Washington State Cougars men's basketball coaches
Washington State University alumni
20th-century African-American sportspeople
21st-century African-American people